RV Pacific Escort I – previously the U.S. Army LT-535 – was an Army tugboat acquired by the U.S. Navy in 1985 as an escort for submarines and as a for-hire oceanographic research ship at the Mare Island Naval Shipyard.

Construction
LT 535 was a Large Tug (LT), Design 377-A, 505 gross ton, vessel built as hull #331 by Levingston Shipbuilding of Orange, Texas for the U.S. Army Transportation Corps during 1943-1944. She was delivered to the Army April 26, 1944 and placed in service as the U.S. Army LT-535.

Service career
LT-535 had been in service with the U.S. Army from 1945 to 1984 when she was acquired and placed in service with the U.S. Navy in 1985, performing her duties with the Navy until finally struck at an unknown date and disposed of.

U.S. Navy career
When acquired by the U.S. Navy in 1985, she was renamed Pacific Escort was  placed into service as an escort for American submarines. She was based at the Mare Island Naval Shipyard, in California, and was available for lease to commercial interests as a general research ship.

Inactivation
Pacific Escort was struck from the Navy List at an unknown date and sold commercial as Ataboy (IMO 8936906). She is believed to be still in commercial service as Brittania U III in Nigeria.

See also
 ShipSpotting.com Pacific Escort
 List of ships of the United States Army

References

Ships built in Orange, Texas
1944 ships
Ships of the United States Army
Oceanographic research ships of the United States Navy
Tugs of the United States Navy